Chopo Volcano, today a quarry, was an inactive volcano, also known as either Anunciación, Coronación, Asunción mountain. Located in Cañas canton of Guanacaste,  6 km north from the Cañas city.

Toponymy 

The name is due to the nickname of the previous owner of the land where the volcano is located.

Physical aspects 

The area is of around 1 km2 and the cone was made of pyroclastic lava flows, its rocks are basaltic olivines.

Social and economic activity  

Today the volcano is a quarry for road raw material. Cattle farming is practiced in the surrounding areas.

See also
List of volcanoes in Costa Rica

References

External links

Stratovolcanoes of Costa Rica
Mountains of Costa Rica
Pleistocene volcanoes